Johanna Magdalene of Saxe-Weissenfels (17 March 1708 – 25 January 1760), was a Duchess consort of Courland and by marriage member of the House of Kettler. By birth she was member of the Saxe-Weissenfels line of the House of Wettin.

Early life 
She was the born as only surviving daughter of Johann Georg, Duke of Saxe-Weissenfels and his wife, Princess Fredericka Elisabeth of Saxe-Eisenach.

Private life 
On 20 September 1730, in Danzig, she married Ferdinand Kettler, the Duke of Courland, who was 75 years old at the time. The marriage remained childless.

References

 

1708 births
1760 deaths
18th-century Latvian people
Duchesses of Courland
18th-century Latvian women
Daughters of monarchs